Berwyn Township may refer to:

 Berwyn Township, Cook County, Illinois
 Berwyn Township, Custer County, Nebraska

Township name disambiguation pages